Alexandra Caroline Grey, M.D. is a fictional character from ABC's medical drama television series Grey's Anatomy, portrayed by actress Chyler Leigh. Created by series producer Shonda Rhimes, the character is first mentioned in season 2  by her younger sister, Molly. She is then introduced in season 3 as the titular protagonist's younger paternal half-sister. She transfers to Seattle Grace Hospital as a new surgical intern after her mother's sudden death, and is eventually named a surgical resident in season 6 episode 2. Leigh was originally contracted to appear for a multi-episode story-arc but ultimately received star-billing from seasons 4 to 8. She has also reprised her role as Lexie on the spin-off show Private Practice.

Characterized by Rhimes as a dork with issues expressing her feelings, Lexie's focal storyline in the series involved her on-again, off-again relationship with plastics attending Mark Sloan (Eric Dane). The pair sustained fatal injuries during an aviation accident in the eighth-season finale, and Seattle Grace Mercy West is subsequently renamed Grey-Sloan Memorial Hospital in their memory. Following their deaths, Rhimes mused regarding the couple's romance: '...he [Mark] and Lexie get to be together in a way. Their love remains true." The reason given for Lexie's departure after over five years on the show was Leigh's desire to spend more time with her family.

Both the character and Leigh's performance received positive feedback and acclaim. Leigh was among the cast to receive a Screen Actors Guild Award nomination for Outstanding Performance by an Ensemble in a Drama Series in 2007.

Storylines

Background 
Alexandra Caroline "Lexie" Grey (born 1984) was the daughter of Thatcher (Jeff Perry) and his second wife, Susan Grey (Mare Winningham). She was also the elder sister of Molly Grey (Mandy Siegfried) and the sister-in-law of Eric Thompson (unseen). Prior to her internship, Lexie's younger sister had already gotten married and was pregnant with Lexie's niece, Laura. 

Throughout her childhood, Lexie remained unaware that she also had an older half-sister, Meredith Grey (Ellen Pompeo), born to Thatcher and his first wife Ellis (Kate Burton), a world-famous general surgeon in 1978. Lexie was extremely intelligent as a child, having skipped third grade and "aced" her psych clerkship. When she turned 7, her parents threw her a surprise party that she always remembered as one of her best birthdays. She was very popular and had a great group of friends in her high school years, during which she was crowned prom queen and class valedictorian.

In contrast to Meredith, Lexie came from a loving home with a happy and idealistic upbringing. Meredith once said of Lexie, "She was raised right. With parents and rules and smiley face posters on her wall." Despite this, the Grey sisters ultimately form a strong familial bond after Lexie moves into Meredith's house.

Lexie possessed an eidetic memory, which was often used as a valuable resource and earned her the nickname "Lexipedia". She demonstrated a high aptitude for both plastics and neurosurgery and was viewed as one of the better young surgeons at the hospital, often being asked to assist on many high-profile surgeries; she was considered the best of the interns in her year.

Season 3 

Near the end of Meredith's intern year, Thatcher and Molly mention that Lexie is a student at Harvard Medical School. After she graduates, Lexie is accepted by Massachusetts General Hospital to pursue her residency. Following her mother's sudden death of complications stemming from the hiccups, Lexie decides to move back to Seattle to care for her father and takes up a surgical internship at Seattle Grace Hospital instead, 1 year behind Meredith who is due to begin her first year of residency. On the day of her mother's funeral, Lexie waits in the car when Thatcher, accompanied by Molly, goes to tell Meredith that she isn't welcome at the ceremony, thus missing the opportunity to meet her older half-sister. Later that night, before her internship at Seattle Grace begins, Lexie meets Derek Shepherd (Patrick Dempsey) at Joe's bar, mirroring Derek's initial meeting with Meredith. The pair flirt and Lexie forwardly offers to buy Derek a drink, but Derek says that he is there with some friends and declines. Upon arriving at the hospital's intern locker room the next day, Lexie meets George O'Malley (T. R. Knight) during the end of his first year as an intern. After Lexie introduces herself, George immediately realizes her identity as Meredith's half-sister.

Season 4 

Lexie quickly befriends George and promises not to tell anyone that he is repeating his internship after failing his intern exam. Lexie's assigned supervising resident is Meredith's best friend Cristina Yang (Sandra Oh), who doesn't take the time to learn her interns' names and thus, designates Lexie as "Three". Although Cristina is initially rude and strict with her, Lexie eventually stands up for herself and manages to earn her mentor's respect, with Yang going so far as to acknowledge Lexie as her best student. Lexie is eager to get to know Meredith but receives a hostile response when she first introduces herself, and her later attempts to bond with her half-sister are similarly rebuffed. She begins sleeping with resident Alex Karev (Justin Chambers), who discovers that Thatcher has descended into alcoholism following his wife's death and often unreasonably lashes out at Lexie. When Lexie is lectured by Meredith for not looking after Thatcher, she finally retaliates and decides to stop pursuing a relationship with her half-sister. After ending the emotionless sex with Alex, Lexie bonds with patient Nick Hanscom (Seth Green) and is present when his exposed artery blows, causing him to suffer massive blood loss. She manages to stop the bleeding but is distraught when Nick later dies anyway. Feeling sympathy, Cristina invites Lexie to join her and Meredith in drinking and dancing, thawing the sisters' relationship to a certain extent. The following morning, Meredith goes out of her way to make Lexie breakfast, which Lexie politely eats despite being allergic to eggs, resulting in her having to be treated at the hospital. Lexie and George later agree to rent a place together but are only able to afford a dilapidated apartment that Lexie attempts to improve by stealing decorations and furniture from the hospital. Lexie begins to develop romantic feelings for George and secretly steals his personnel files from Chief Richard Webber's (James Pickens Jr.) office, discovering that George had only failed his intern exam by one point. She encourages George to try and convince the Chief that he deserves a second chance, to which the Chief agrees. An ecstatic George then casually plants a kiss on Lexie, completely unaware of her feelings for him.

Season 5 

Lexie continues to harbor romantic feelings for an oblivious George; their relationship is a reflection of George's previous infatuation with an oblivious Meredith. She prioritizes helping George study over taking part in a rare surgery offered to her by plastics attending Mark Sloan (Eric Dane), but feels betrayed when George fails to even request that she become one of his interns after he passes his exam. Finally realizing that George doesn't feel the same way about her, Lexie gives up on her feelings for him and the pair's friendship begins to fizzle out. She soon discovers that some of her fellow interns have secretly been practicing simple medical procedures on each other, and begins taking part in these unauthorized operations to prove that she's "hardcore". Seeking a more daring procedure, Sadie Harris (Melissa George) suggests that they remove her appendix. Although Lexie agrees, she quickly finds herself out of her depth and is forced to seek Meredith and Cristina's aid to save Sadie's life, after which all of the interns in the "cabal" are put on probation. Derek finds Lexie exhausted and distraught at the day's events and allows her to move into the attic at his and Meredith's house. Lexie then begins a flirtation with Mark and is highly impressed after watching him successfully perform a cutting-edge surgery. Later that night, she shows up at Mark's hotel room and undresses herself while repeating to him, "Teach me". The pair grow close very quickly and begin a romantic relationship, though they are forced to keep it a secret when Derek warns Mark away from Lexie due to their large age gap and the latter being Meredith's younger sister (earning Lexie the nickname "Little Grey").

When Derek's mother (Tyne Daly) visits Seattle, Mark is initially fearful that she will disapprove of his relationship with Lexie. After meeting Lexie, however, Mrs. Shepherd tells Mark that she is exactly the kind of youthful person he should be with. When Lexie and Mark are making out in an on-call room, she accidentally gives him a penile fracture and has to seek the help of Callie Torres (Sara Ramirez) and Owen Hunt (Kevin McKidd) to treat him. Sadie then publicly takes the blame for Mark's injury to spare Lexie the burden of suffering further humiliation and guilt. Lexie later wins an intern competition organized by Izzie Stevens (Katherine Heigl) and is congratulated by Mark. Wanting to date Mark in public, Lexie convinces him to come clean to Derek about their relationship, to which Mark agrees. But during his confession, Mark does not realize that Derek has just been devastated by the loss of a patient, and they then get into a fistfight. The two men continue to feud, resulting in Lexie beginning to stress-eat until they eventually reconcile. Lexie is chosen by Mark to assist him with an extremely rare facial transplant surgery only to be judged and mocked by her peers; they believe that Mark is taking advantage of her and that she is using him. Lexie then kisses Mark in front of the other interns before stating, "They think that we're ugly but I know that we're beautiful, and we can adapt to a hostile environment." Lexie is delighted when Meredith asks her to be a bridesmaid at her and Derek's wedding, though they ultimately give the ceremony to Alex and a cancer-stricken Izzie, which Lexie attends with Mark. Lexie later asks Mark to meet her newly-sober father, which Mark initially refuses as he states that fathers have never liked him. However, Mark realizes how much he wants to build a future with Lexie so he ends up going for dinner with her and Thatcher. Soon after, Mark decides to purchase a house and invites Lexie to move in with him only for her to decline, concerned about how fast their relationship is progressing.

Season 6 

Lexie feels immense guilt following George's death, having abandoned their friendship after he failed to reciprocate her romantic feelings towards him. She is consoled by Mark and, after becoming a surgical resident, agrees to move into his new apartment with him. Lexie and the other residents grow increasingly stressed in the wake of Chief Webber's announcement that there will be an administrative merger with Mercy West Hospital, meaning that Seattle Grace will have to lay off a large portion of its staff members. Mark encourages Lexie to relax and just try her best during this period, advising her not to worry as she deserves her job. Lexie soon finds that while she is safe from the layoffs, many of her friends have been cut from the program. To take everyone's minds off the merger, Owen takes Lexie, Mark, Derek, Meredith, and Cristina to play baseball together. Thatcher is later admitted into the hospital with liver failure stemming from his former alcoholism. When Lexie discovers that she is not a suitable transplant candidate, Meredith steps in and donates part of her liver to Thatcher to spare Lexie the grief of losing her father. Following the merger, Lexie develops a rivalry with Mercy West resident April Kepner (Sarah Drew), who desperately attempts to undermine Lexie while they are both on Derek's service. Lexie retaliates by stealing April's notebook and using its personal contents to humiliate her, though Lexie later apologizes. When a patient dies from a medical negligence mistake committed by one of the many surgeons who treated her, Webber starts a witch hunt to trace back the culprit and identify the cause of death, and Lexie is among the doctors who are questioned; it is ultimately discovered that April was the one at fault.

Derek later recruits Lexie for his unauthorized "rogue surgery" on hospital technician Isaac's (Faran Tahir) "inoperable" tumor, with Lexie acting as Derek's own caregiver during the long and exhausting procedure. Lexie is supported by Mark and, to avoid having to leave the operating room, resorts to using a diaper so that she can sufficiently hydrate herself before and during the surgery. Near the year's end, Mark and Lexie receive a shock when a pregnant teenage girl named Sloan Riley (Leven Rambin) shows up claiming to be Mark's daughter, and her parentage is soon confirmed. Mark quickly agrees to let Sloan and the baby move in permanently without consulting Lexie, resulting in her ending their relationship as she feels she is still too young to be a grandmother. An upset and drunk Lexie then engages in a one-night stand with Alex but feels guilty and confesses to Mark, who becomes furious with her despite also admitting that he had a one-night stand with Addison Montgomery (Kate Walsh). Although she secretly suppresses her feelings for Mark, Lexie and Alex assume a casual relationship that Lexie flaunts to make Mark jealous. Lexie later breaks down in front of Meredith when Alex tells her that Mark has started dating Teddy Altman (Kim Raver). After Sloan gives her baby up for adoption and leaves Seattle, however, Mark approaches Lexie and confesses his love to her. A stunned Lexie hesitantly states that Alex is now her boyfriend, to which Mark replies, "I know. I'm just saying you could have a husband."

Lexie takes part in a surgery on Alison Clark (Caroline Williams) and informs her husband Gary   (Michael O'Neill) that it was a success, only for Alison to suffer a stroke and fall into a coma that Derek and Webber state she is unlikely to wake from. As Alison had signed a DNR form, Lexie is forced to turn off the machines keeping her alive despite Gary's pleas for her to stop. After failing in an attempt to sue Seattle Grace Mercy West, a grief-stricken Gary Clark later returns to the hospital with a gun, seeking revenge on Derek, Webber, and Lexie. Mark shields Lexie during the shooting and the pair attempt to save a critically wounded Alex. Lexie heads out into the evacuated hospital to search for supplies and comes face-to-face with Clark. Before Clark can shoot her, however, a SWAT team member wounds him and Lexie manages to escape. Lexie and Mark proceed to save Alex's life, during which Lexie realizes that Alex is still in love with his ex-wife Izzie, as he calls for her while delirious and on the verge of death. After having a conversation with Webber, Gary Clark eventually commits suicide, having killed 11 people and wounded another 7 as well as causing Meredith to suffer a miscarriage.

Season 7 

After openly acknowledging the shooting as a mass murder during a therapy session with trauma counselor Andrew Perkins (James Tupper) and the other residents, Lexie experiences a psychotic breakdown stemming from PTSD and sleep deprivation while she is treating a patient. She is admitted to the hospital's psychiatric ward, where she is sedated for over 50 hours with Meredith remaining by her side. Alex breaks off his relationship with Lexie because he cannot handle having to care for a person going through PTSD and he enjoys sleeping with women that find having been shot to be attractive. Lexie, after recovering and being cleared for surgery, confronts Alex at Cristina and Owen's wedding and knocks him down a peg by telling him that the reason he is alive is because of her. Lexie becomes irritated when others at the hospital view her as fragile and incompetent due to her breakdown and works hard to repair her image; she saves a woman from being paralyzed when no one else caught the issue. She continues to gain her confidence throughout the season and helps Miranda Bailey (Chandra Wilson) discover a cure for hospital fistula. Lexie's rivalry with April intensifies when the latter begins growing closer to Meredith, but Meredith later assures Lexie that she will always be her sister.

Meanwhile, Lexie and Mark continue to work together but never seem to get their timing right, with Lexie acting hostile towards Mark when he wishes to reconcile, and Mark being caught sleeping with a flavor-of-the-day when Lexie wants to rekindle their romance. When Lexie and Mark both realize that they continue to harbor feelings for each other, however, they resume their relationship. Lexie nearly suffers another breakdown when the victims of a school shooting are sent to Seattle Grace Mercy West for treatment, which reminds her of her near-death experience during the shooting at the hospital. Mark comforts Lexie and the doctors ultimately manage to save all the victims of the shooting, after which Lexie tells Mark that she loves him. Lexie and Mark's happiness once again comes to a halt when she discovers that during their break-up, Mark had unintentionally impregnated Callie, and she ends their relationship once more because she is not ready for children.

Thatcher is admitted to the hospital with kidney stones and Lexie is shocked to discover that he is dating a 20-year-old girl. Concerned about Lexie's well-being and eager to win her back, Mark recruits his protégé Jackson Avery (Jesse Williams) to find out what is upsetting her. She reveals to Jackson that she is frustrated with the people she cares about, specifically Mark and her father, making major life-changing decisions without considering her feelings. When Lexie overhears Mark saying that he will take care of his and Callie's child regardless of what sickness it is born with, she expresses regret for neglecting to even let Mark explain the situation before she walked away from him. However, Jackson manages to convince Lexie that nobody simply has one soulmate and the two subsequently begin dating. Mark is furious and distraught when he discovers that Jackson has entered into a relationship with Lexie and desperately attempts to win her back, but shortly after, Callie is involved in a severe car accident and Lexie consoles Mark. After Mark and Callie's baby is born, Mark tells Lexie that she is the only thing missing to make his life perfect. Lexie explains that she will always love Mark and will go back to him if he continues to pursue her, but she believes that they aren't suited because they have different desires. Mark then agrees to let her go, giving her and Jackson his blessing.

Season 8 

Although initially happy in her relationship with Jackson, Lexie grows increasingly distraught and frustrated when she discovers that Mark has started dating an ophthalmologist named Julia. When she sees Mark and Julia flirting during a charity softball match, Lexie's jealousy gets the better of her and she throws a ball at Julia, injuring the latter's chest. Jackson senses that Lexie is still in love with Mark and ends their relationship. Lexie begins working under Derek's service and becomes increasingly proficient in neurosurgery, helping Derek with a set of "hopeless cases" – high risk surgeries for patients who had otherwise run out of options. During a surgery, Derek is called away on an emergency, leaving Lexie and Meredith to carry out the procedure on their own. Though Derek had instructed them to merely reduce the patient's brain tumor, Meredith allows Lexie to remove it completely, despite not being authorized by either the patient or Derek to do so. The sisters celebrate the successful surgery but Lexie is devastated when she discovers that the patient suffered severe brain damage, thus losing the ability to speak.

Alex, Jackson and April move out of Meredith's house without inviting Lexie to join them, and with Derek and Meredith settling down with baby Zola, Lexie begins to feel lonely and isolated. Lexie is left babysitting Zola on Valentine's Day and contemplates confessing her true feelings to Mark. But after plucking up the courage to visit his apartment, she finds Mark studying with Jackson and loses her nerve, instead claiming that she wanted to set up a playdate for the kids. When Mark confides in Derek that he and Julia have been discussing moving in together, Derek warns Lexie not to miss her chance again, resulting in her professing her love to a shell-shocked Mark, who merely thanks her for her candor. Mark later confesses to Derek that he feels the same way about Lexie, but is unsure of how to go about things.

Days later, Lexie is named as part of a team of surgeons that will be sent to Boise to separate conjoined twins, along with Mark, Meredith, Derek, Cristina and Arizona Robbins (Jessica Capshaw). While flying to their destination, the doctors' plane crashes in the wilderness and Lexie is crushed under debris from the aircraft but manages to alert Mark and Cristina to help her. The pair try in vain to free Lexie, who realizes that she is suffering from a hemothorax and is unlikely to survive. While Cristina tries to find an oxygen tank and water to save Lexie, Mark holds Lexie's hand and professes his love for her, telling her that they will get married, have kids, and live the best life together as they are "meant to be". While fantasizing about the future that she and Mark could have had together, Lexie succumbs to her injuries and dies moments before Meredith arrives. The remaining doctors are left stranded in the woods waiting for rescue, with a devastated Meredith crying profusely and Mark refusing to let go of Lexie's hand.

Season 9 onwards 
In season 9, the remaining surgeons are rescued from the wilderness days later and Lexie's body is returned to Seattle. Still devastated by Lexie's passing, Mark advises his protégé Jackson, 'when you love someone, tell them', which Mark felt he did not tell Lexie enough when she was alive. Mark subsequently makes a clean break with Julia, stating that he had always only truly loved Lexie. Mark is soon placed on life support due to the extensive internal injuries he sustained during the plane crash and, as determined by his will, the machines keeping him alive are turned off as he showed no signs of waking after 30 days. Following Mark's death, flashbacks of several moments in his life showed him being videotaped at Callie and Arizona's wedding; at the end of his congratulations speech, Mark declares that Lexie was the one, true partner he wanted to grow old and dance with at their granddaughter's wedding. When the remaining survivors of the plane crash pool their compensation money to purchase Seattle Grace Mercy West, they agree to rename it "Grey Sloan Memorial Hospital" in tribute to Lexie and Mark.

In season 15, Lexie's spirit appears alongside the ghosts of Mark, Derek, George, Doc and Ellis as they watch Meredith leave the hospital after treating a patient whose family celebrates the Day of the Dead.

In season 17, Lexie is one of the people that visits Meredith in her dreams while she is on a ventilator.

Relationships

Meredith Grey 
When Lexie first told Meredith she was her half-sister, Meredith was initially hostile, ignoring her in the corridors and refusing to teach her. However, after a patient dies, leaving Lexie distraught, Cristina invites her to go drinking with her and Meredith which was when Meredith starts to warm up to Lexie and the idea of having a sister. The next day, Meredith specially made eggs for Lexie, who, despite being allergic, still ate them. The sisters' relationship continues to grow throughout the series until she died in a plane accident. Lexie is said to have been Meredith’s favorite sister.

Cristina Yang 

Yang, who was her resident, nicknamed her Three and acted similar towards Lexie as how Meredith did in the beginning. After Lexie lost a patient, Cristina helped her by inviting her to drinks with Meredith. As the series progressed, Lexie became equally close with Cristina.

Development

Casting and creation 

Leigh first appeared on the show during the last two episodes of the third season as Meredith's half-sister, Lexie Grey. Following Isaiah Washington's departure who portrayed Preston Burke, it was reported that show's executives were planning on adding new cast members, such as Lexie. She was officially upgraded to a series' regular on July 11, 2007, for the fourth season. On casting Chyler Leigh as Lexie, Grey's Anatomy creator Shonda Rhimes said: "We met with a lot of young actresses, but Chyler stood out—she had a quality that felt right and real to me. It felt like she could be Meredith's sister, but she had a depth that was very interesting."

In September 2011, Leigh requested an extended summer hiatus to spend more time with her family. This was granted by Rhimes, and the actress returned full-time in mid-October. Leigh's character died in the eighth-season finale. In May 2012, Rhimes revealed why she decided to have Lexie die: "I love Chyler and I love the character of Lexie Grey. She was an important member of my Grey's family. This was not an easy decision. But it was a decision that Chyler and I came to together. We had a lot of thoughtful discussion about it and ultimately we both decided this was the right time for her character's journey to end. As far as I'm concerned, Chyler will always remain a part of the Shondaland family and I can't wait to work with her again in the future." Following the death of her character, Leigh released a statement saying:

Characterization 

Leigh's character has been called "reliable, trustworthy, timid, and apprehensive" by Grey's Anatomy executives. In her early appearances, it was revealed that Lexie has a photographic memory, which she applied to her surgical career. This led her to being nicknamed "Lexipedia" by Alex Karev. The character has also been described as an "innocent young intern" by Alex Keen of The Trades.

Of the character, Leigh said: "She's a very vulnerable person from a very healthy background—she knows how to make good relationships but at this point [season four], she's coming into so much opposition she's trying to adjust to it." Debbie Chang of BuddyTV commented on Lexie's early characterization, including her sexual relationship with Karev:

Similarities have been established between Lexie and Meredith. Series writer, Stacy McKee, commented on this:

Lexie entertained several relationships throughout her time on Grey's Anatomy. In her early appearances, she maintained a strong friendship with George O'Malley until she began developing romantic feelings for him. Rhimes offered the insight: "I love them as friends. They make good friends. We all have that friend we met in school or the gym or somewhere – we just hit it off right away. And right away there was no pretense or airs. Just pure honesty. That's Lexie and George. They're really good friends and I can see the friendship evolving into something even greater. At least, that's what Lexie is hoping. She is my kind of girl. The girl who likes the guy because he is a GOOD guy and that's what George is. He is a good guy and that's something that Lexie could use now. She's going through her own challenges what with Meredith and losing her own mother and trying to keep things afloat. I'm rooting for Lexie. She's my kind of girl and I hope that she gets what she deserves: love. And more kisses. There should always be that."

Lexie's most significant relationship on the show was with Mark Sloan. Following the character's death, Rhimes said:

Reception 

While reception to Lexie Grey was initially mixed, both the character and Chyler Leigh's performance garnered positive feedback and acclaim as her role on the series progressed, and Lexie soon became a favorite of critics and fans of the show. Eileen Lulevitch, an entertainment reviewer for TV Guide, praised Lexie's introduction in season four. Former The Star-Ledger columnist Alan Sepinwall was also favorable of Lexie's arrival at Seattle Grace, feeling that "she's still being written as Meredith circa season one in an attempt to make us like her, but I didn't mind the manipulation, if only because there are so few characters left on this show to like. The Buzzsugar television reviewer also praised Lexie's introduction in the Buzzsugar review. On the other hand, People was initially less than impressed with Lexie and criticized the way Leigh's character first approached her sister, calling it "rude". Laura Burrows from IGN wrote: "Everything she says and does is obnoxious and does harm to someone. Lexie is an idiot and should be shot or drowned or exploded." Jennifer Armstrong of Entertainment Weekly was also critical of Leigh's early appearances, referring to her as "awkward". However, Armstrong later noted that the "sparkling" friendship development between Lexie and O'Malley "won her over".

The character's transition from seasons four to five was positively reviewed, with Alex Keen of The Trades writing: "Her presence and confidence have increased quite a bit since last season, and actress, Chyler Leigh, does a fantastic job of making this progression feel seamless. Since the series has defused the tension between Little Grey and Big Grey (aka Meredith), Lexie has clear sailing through the season and steals the show as one of the best current characters on the series." The character's romantic relationship with Eric Dane's Mark Sloan has been acclaimed, with Chris Monfette of IGN writing: "Sloan's honest relationship with Lexie helped to make both characters infinitely more interesting and mature." BuddyTV lauded the development and progression of Lexie and Mark's relationship throughout season five, saying, "They are beautiful, and they can adapt to a hostile environment." The Huffington Post Michael Pascua praised Leigh's performance and Lexie's evolution in season six. Pascua wrote that he enjoyed Lexie's "humorous" and "emotionally connective" role as a "genuine character" during the merger and layoffs, commenting: "She still maintained that book-smart ability to repeat facts (like the merger cases) and shows a command of medical situations... She shouldn't be worried about the merger because she's a good doctor." TV Guide Adam Bryant praised Leigh's "powerful performance" in season six, writing: "The bond that is growing between Lexie and Meredith is nice to see. From Meredith finally saying out loud how she feels about Lexie, to Lexie being at Mer's side when she wakes up, I am really glad to see these sisters' happy." Lexie's storyline in season six was also praised by PopSugar. Leigh served as a primary vocalist in season seven's musical episode, "Song Beneath the Song", and received rave reviews from television critics, including the Boston Heralds Mark Perigard. Leigh's performance in the season eight finale, which was also her character's final appearance, was deemed as "phenomenal" by Digital Spy Ben Lee.

Lexie Grey was listed in Wetpaint's "10 Hottest Female Doctors on TV". In 2007, at the 14th Screen Actors Guild Awards, Leigh and the rest of the cast of Grey's Anatomy received a nomination for Outstanding Performance by an Ensemble in a Drama Series.

References 
Specific

General

External links 
Grey's Anatomy at ABC.com

Grey's Anatomy characters
American female characters in television
Fictional characters from Seattle
Television characters introduced in 2007
Fictional female doctors
Fictional Harvard University people
Fictional characters with eidetic memory
Fictional surgeons